Julia Glushko and Priscilla Hon were the defending champions, however Glushko chose to participate in Hua Hin, while Hon chose to participate in Surbiton.

Cristina Dinu and Ganna Poznikhirenko won the title, defeating Alexandra Panova and Anastasia Pribylova in the final, 6–3, 7–6(8–6).

Seeds

Draw

Draw

References
Main Draw

Internazionali Femminili di Brescia - Doubles